is a railway station located in Kitakyūshū, Fukuoka.

Lines 

Chikuhō Electric Railroad
Chikuhō Electric Railroad Line

Platforms

Adjacent stations

Surrounding area
 Seitanomori Golf Courts
 Tokubetushien Special Needs School
 Takami Shrine
 Takesue Elementary School
 Takanosu Kindergarten
 Kamiho Park
 Yahata Library Oike Branch

Railway stations in Fukuoka Prefecture
Railway stations in Japan opened in 1956